Stephen Hugo Woods Jr. (born June 10, 1995) is an American professional baseball pitcher who is a free agent.

Amateur career
Woods attended Half Hollow Hills East High School in Dix Hills, New York. While pitching for the school's baseball team in 2013, he threw two consecutive no-hitters.

The Tampa Bay Rays selected Woods in the sixth round of the 2013 MLB draft, but he did not sign with the Rays. He enrolled at State University of New York at Albany, and played college baseball for the Albany Great Danes. In the summer of 2014, he played collegiate summer baseball for the North Fork Ospreys of the Hamptons Collegiate Baseball League, and in the summer of 2015 he played for the Wareham Gatemen of the Cape Cod Baseball League.

Professional career
After his junior year, the San Francisco Giants selected Woods in the eighth round of the 2016 MLB draft. Woods signed with the Giants rather than return to Albany for his senior year. He spent his first professional season with both the AZL Giants and the Low-A Salem-Keizer Volcanoes, posting a combined 1–2 record and 3.34 ERA in 35 total innings. In 2017, he played for the Single-A Augusta GreenJackets, going 6–7 with a 2.95 ERA in 110 innings.

On December 20, 2017, the Giants traded Woods, Denard Span, Christian Arroyo, and Matt Krook to the Rays in exchange for Evan Longoria and cash considerations. He did not pitch in 2018 due to injury. Woods returned to pitch in 2019, spending the year with the High-A Charlotte Stone Crabs and compiling a 9–3 record with a 1.88 ERA over 18 games (12 starts), striking out 79 over  innings.

On December 12, 2019, Woods was selected by the Kansas City Royals in the 2019 Rule 5 draft. On July 21, 2020, Woods was returned to the Rays organization, but was traded back to the Royals the same day in exchange for a player to be named later. The Royals sent outfielder Michael Gigliotti to Tampa Bay on September 12 as the PTBNL. He did not play a minor league game in 2020 since the season was cancelled due to the COVID-19 pandemic. He was assigned to the Double-A Northwest Arkansas Naturals to begin the 2021 season. He elected free agency on November 10, 2022.

Woods was named to the Italian national baseball team for the 2023 World Baseball Classic.

See also
Rule 5 draft results

References

External links

1995 births
Living people
Sportspeople from Suffolk County, New York
Wareham Gatemen players
Baseball players from New York (state)
Albany Great Danes baseball
Augusta GreenJackets players
Arizona League Giants players
Charlotte Stone Crabs players
Northwest Arkansas Naturals players
Omaha Storm Chasers players
Salem-Keizer Volcanoes players
Surprise Saguaros players
2023 World Baseball Classic players